Claude Larose may refer to:

Claude Larose (ice hockey, born 1942), played primarily for the Montreal Canadiens and other teams of the NHL
Claude Larose (ice hockey, born 1955), played primarily in the World Hockey Association